Laupāhoehoe High & Elementary School is a public, co-educational high school, middle school and elementary school of the Hawaii State Department of Education. It serves grades kindergarten through twelve and was established in 1904.

General information
Laupāhoehoe High & Elementary School is located in Laupāhoehoe, Hawaii in Hawaii County on the Island of Hawaii, United States.  The campus is on Mamalahoa Highway and overlooks the ocean. Laupāhoehoe has no feeder schools.  The mascot is the Seasider and its school colors are blue and gold.

History
Laupāhoehoe School was started in 1883 for students from the Hāmākua Coastal Sugar Cane Communities and fishing communities. The high school was established in 1904.

The school, originally was located on Laupāhoehoe peninsula, but was destroyed by the April Fools' Day tsunami on April 1, 1946. Due to the tsunami, the old school building at Laupāhoehoe was inundated, and twenty students and four teachers drowned. A monument to the dead now stands on Laupāhoehoe Point. In 1948, a new campus was built at its present location.

Commencement
Laupāhoehoe High & Elementary School's commencement exercises are normally held during the first week of June.

References

Educational institutions established in 1883
Schools in Hawaii County, Hawaii
Public high schools in Hawaii
1883 establishments in Hawaii